Two nuclides are isotones if they have the same neutron number N, but different proton number Z. For example, boron-12 and carbon-13 nuclei both contain 7 neutrons, and so are isotones. Similarly, 36S, 37Cl, 38Ar, 39K, and 40Ca nuclei are all isotones of 20 because they all contain 20 neutrons. Despite its similarity to the Greek for "same stretching", the term was formed by the German physicist K. Guggenheimer by changing the "p" in "isotope" from "p" for "proton" to "n" for "neutron".

The largest numbers of observationally stable nuclides exist for isotones 50 (five: 86Kr, 88Sr, 89Y, 90Zr, 92Mo) and 82 (six: 138Ba, 139La, 140Ce, 141Pr, 142Nd, 144Sm). Neutron numbers for which there are no stable isotones are 19, 21, 35, 39, 45, 61, 89, 115, 123, and 127 or more. In contrast, the proton numbers for which there are no stable isotopes are 43, 61, and 83 or more. This is related to nuclear magic numbers, the number of nucleons forming complete shells within the nucleus, e.g. 2, 8, 20, 28, 50, 82, and 126. No more than one stable nuclide has the same odd neutron number, except for 1 (2H and 3He), 5 (9Be and 10B), 7 (13C and 14N), 55 (97Mo and 99Ru), and 107 (179Hf and 180mTa). Odd neutron numbers for which there is a stable nuclide and a primordial radionuclide are 27 (50V), 65 (113Cd), 81 (138La), 85 (147Sm), and 105 (176Lu). Neutron numbers for which there are two primordial radionuclides are 88 (151Eu and 152Gd) and 112 (187Re and 190Pt).

See also
Isotopes are nuclides having the same number of protons: e.g. carbon-12 and carbon-13.
Isobars are nuclides having the same mass number (i.e. sum of protons plus neutrons): e.g. carbon-12 and boron-12.
Nuclear isomers are different excited states of the same type of nucleus. A transition from one isomer to another is accompanied by emission or absorption of a gamma ray, or the process of internal conversion. (Not to be confused with chemical isomers.)

Notes

Nuclear physics